This is a list of  electric power companies in Turkey.

Turkish power companies
Akenerji Elektrik Üretim A.S., Gümüssuyu, Istanbul
Aksa Energy, Günesli, Istanbul 
Alarko Energy Group, Istanbul 
As Makinsan Makina Insaat San Müh Ltd Sti, Çankaya, Ankara
Ayen Enerji A.S., Ankara 
Barmek Holding, Maltepe, Ankara 
Baymina Enerji, Polatli, Ankara 
Bereket Enerji, Gürcan, Denizli
Bilgin Enerji, Ankara 
Bis Enerji Elektrik Üretim A.S.
Borusan EnBW Enerji Yatırımları ve Üretim A.S., Istanbul
Çalik Enerji A.S., Sögütözü, Ankara
Ciner Group, Üsküdar Istanbul
Desa Enerji Elektrik Üretimi Otoprodüktör Grubu A.S., Pinarbasi, Izmir
Ekinciler Holding A.S., Maslak, Istanbul
Electricity Generation Company (state owned EÜAS), Bahçelievler, Ankara
ENDA Enerji Holding AS, Alsancak, Izmir
Enerjisa, Alikahya, Izmit
Enkapower (Enka Insaat ve Sanayi A.S.), Beşiktaş, Istanbul
Entropy Enerji, Yesilköy, Istanbul
ERIH Energy Holding, Beşiktaş, Istanbul
Ersin Enerji, Kadıköy, Istanbul
Gama Energy Inc., Kavaklidere, Ankara 
Genel Enerji, Kavaklidere, Ankara 
Güngör Elektrik, Bahçelievler, Ankara 
Hamitabat Elektrik Üretim Ve Ticaret A.S. (HEAS), Lüleburgaz, Kirklareli
Isın Elektromekanik Tesisler, Ankara 
Iskenderun Enerji Üretim Ve Ticaret A.S., Ankara 
Içtas Enerji, Kavaklidere, Ankara
Karadeniz Energy Group, Kagithane, Istanbul 
Nurol Energy Production and Marketing Inc., Kavaklidere, Ankara
Ova Elektrik A.S., Karaköy, Istanbul
Petkim
Proterm Enerji, Balgat, Ankara
Proterm Enerji, Balgat, Ankara
Reswell Energy Generation Company, Yenimahalle, Ankara
Turkish Electric Power (TEP), Kazan, Ankara
Yeniköy Elektrik Üretim Ve Tic A.S. (YEAS), Muğla
Zorlu Enerji, Avcilar, Istanbul 
Joule Enerji, Osmangazi, Bursa

See also

 Energy law

References